Jip may refer to:


People

Given name 
 Kim Jip (1574–1656), Korean scholar
 Kwon Jip (born 1984), South Korean footballer
 Jip van den Bos (born 1996), Dutch racing cyclist

Surname
 Ye (surname), romanized Jip in Cantonese

Arts and entertainment
 Jip (Doctor Dolittle), a fictional dog
 Jip and Janneke, a series of children's books
 Jip, His Story, a 1996 children's book by American novelist Katherine Paterson
 Mister Jip, a fictional character belonging to the Marvel Comics Universe
 The beloved dog of Dora Spenlow in the Charles Dickens 1850 novel David Copperfield

Other uses 
 Japan Innovation Party, a political party
 JNK interacting proteins; see JNK

See also 
 Gyp (disambiguation)
 Jip Jip Conservation Park, Marcollat, South Australia